Greenstein is a surname, which may refer to:

 Barry Greenstein, a professional poker player, and one of the first employees of Symantec, developer of their first product Q&A
 Jeff Greenstein, an American television writer, producer and director.
 Jesse L. Greenstein, an American astronomer
 Joe Greenstein, a 20th-century strongman
 Linda R. Greenstein, an American Democratic Party politician, who has served in the New Jersey General Assembly since 2000
 Tylan "Ty" Greenstein, musician in Girlyman
 Robert Greenstein, founder and executive director of the Center on Budget and Policy Priorities
 Robin Greenstein, a singer, songwriter and traditional musician from New York City
 Scott Greenstein, President and Chief Content Officer of Sirius XM Satellite Radio
 Shane Greenstein, MBA Class of 1957 Professor of Business Administration at the Harvard Business School
 Tony Greenstein, a British Jewish left-wing activist

See also
 Gerald Grinstein, the current CEO of Delta Air Lines

Jewish surnames

de:Greenstein
fr:Greenstein
it:Greenstein
pl:Greenstein
pt:Greenstein